SCCY

 Service Canada Centres for Youth
 SCCY Industries an American weapons producer